NA-82 Sargodha-II is a constituency for the National Assembly of Pakistan.

Members of Parliament

1988—2002: NA-48 Sargodha-II

2002-2018: NA-65 Sargodha-II

2018-2022: NA-89 Sargodha-II

Election 2002 

General elections were held on 10 Oct 2002. Chaudhry Ghias Ahmed Mela of PML-Q won by 62,306 votes.

Election 2008 

The result of general election 2008 in this constituency is given below.

Result 
Ch. Ghias Ahmed Mela succeeded in the election 2008 and became the member of National Assembly.

Election 2013 

General elections were held on 11 May 2013. Mohsin Shahnawaz Ranjha of PML-N won by 102,871 votes and became the  member of National Assembly.

Election 2018 
General elections were held on 25 July 2018.

See also
NA-82 Sargodha-I
NA-84 Sargodha-III

References

External links 
Election result's official website

NA-065